The Sahitya Akademi Award is the second-highest literary honor in India. The Sahitya Akademi, India's National Academy of Letters, aims at "promoting Indian literature throughout the world". The Akademi annually confers awards on writers of "the most outstanding books of literary merit". The awards are given for works published in any of the 24 languages recognised by the akademi. Instituted in 1954, the award recognizes and promotes excellence in writing and acknowledge new trends. The annual process of selecting awardees runs for the preceding twelve months. The following is a list of winners of the Sahitya Akademi Award for writings in Rajasthani language.

Recipients

References

Sahitya Akademi Award
 
Sahitya Akademi Award
Rajasthani